Ivry-sur-Seine is a station in Paris' express suburban rail system, the RER. It is situated on the Paris–Bordeaux railway. The station is situated in the eastern side of Ivry-sur-Seine, in Val-de-Marne. Travelers can take RATP bus 125 and 323 to connect between this station and Mairie d'Ivry on Paris Métro Line 7.

See also 
 List of stations of the Paris RER

External links 
 

Réseau Express Régional stations
Railway stations in France opened in 1840
Railway stations in Val-de-Marne